Daphnusa is a genus of moths in the family Sphingidae erected by Francis Walker in 1856.

Species
Daphnusa ailanti (Boisduval, 1875)
Daphnusa ocellaris Walker, 1856
Daphnusa philippinensis Brechlin, 2009
Daphnusa sinocontinentalis Brechlin, 2009
Daphnusa zythum Haxaire & Melichar, 2009

References 

Smerinthini
Heteroneura genera
Taxa named by Francis Walker (entomologist)